Todd Siler (born August 23, 1953) is an American multimedia artist, author, educator, and inventor, equally well known for his art and for his work in creativity research. A graduate of Bowdoin College, he became the first visual artist to be granted a PhD from MIT (interdisciplinary studies in Psychology and Art, 1986).   Siler began advocating the full integration of the arts and sciences in the 1970s and is the founder of the ArtScience Program and movement.

Creativity research
In the early 1980s, Siler made an extensive study of genius across numerous disciplines to see what, if anything, such highly creative people as Albert Einstein and Sergei Rachmaninoff have, or more importantly do, in common. Although such inquiries are standard, Siler's work went further than any work before or since in examining how methods used by highly creative people might work on the neurological and cellular level. "Creativity is any unconditioned response," is typical of Siler's approach, which both validates and challenges the work of luminaries in the field such as Howard Gardner, Mihaly Csikszentmihalyi and Robert Root-Bernstein (Encyclopedia of Creativity, 1999).  These theories were elaborated in two books, Breaking The Mind Barrier: The ArtScience of Neurocosmology (Simon & Schuster, 1990; Touchstone Books, 1992), which is largely intended for scholars, and Think Like A Genius (Bantam Books, 1997; Transworld, 1998) written for the general reader. Siler has developed these theories into proprietary programs which are used extensively in schools and corporations.

Visual arts
The son of an aspiring concert pianist and bio-medical researcher, as a child, Siler was a prodigy in the fine arts, often using highly detailed drawings to express his ideas on integrating the arts and sciences. He studied art as an undergraduate, spending a year "apprenticed" in the studio of American artist Leonard Baskin. In his 20s Siler was part of the same SoHo art scene which launched Julian Schnabel, Francesco Clemente and David Salle. Today, Siler's artworks are in numerous public collections including the Solomon R. Guggenheim Museum, The Metropolitan Museum of Art (20th Century Collection), The Museum of Modern Art in New York City, the Pushkin Museum of Fine Arts in Moscow, and The Israel Museum in Jerusalem.

In 2006, Siler's multimedia exhibition at New York's Ronald Feldman Gallery showed off his artwork relating to what he described as a nature-inspired "Fractal Reactor", a nuclear fusion reactor based on fractal geometry.

Education and invention
As an artist who has championed the study of science, Siler worked with the Cherry Creek School District (Colorado) to pioneer experiential learning methodologies based on the understanding and creation of systems of metaphor.

Siler was instrumental in developing the interdisciplinary curriculum for The Israel Arts and Science Academy (IASA) in Jerusalem.

These programs have become popular with Fortune 500 companies as a way of promoting out-of-the-box thinking.

In addition to being an artist and scholar, Siler holds a number of patents on a wide range of inventions, including a widely used computer-graphics input device and textile printing machinery.

Awards
In 2011, Siler received the Leonardo da Vinci World Award of Arts in recognition of his contributions to contemporary and visual arts, for stimulating creativity, inspiring innovation, and uniting art and science to enrich the experience of creative learning.

References

External links
 
 Siler's works at Feldman Gallery
 Todd Siler Metaphorming Minds Artist's Book
 Website for Siler's book Think Like A Genius

1953 births
Living people
Creativity researchers
American installation artists
Bowdoin College alumni
American inventors
20th-century American painters
American male painters
21st-century American painters
21st-century American male artists
American self-help writers
American science writers
American education writers
Nuclear technology
20th-century American sculptors
20th-century American male artists
American male sculptors
American contemporary painters